Paul Cooper may refer to:

Paul Cooper (footballer, born 1953), English football goalkeeper for Birmingham, Ipswich, Leicester, Manchester City and Stockport
Paul Cooper (footballer, born 1957), English football defender for Huddersfield Town, Grimsby Town and Nuneaton Borough
Paul Cooper (footballer, born 1975), English football midfielder for Darlington
Paul Cooper (Australian footballer) (born 1968), Australian rules footballer
Paul Cooper (sailor) (born 1928), Hong Kong sailor
Paul Cooper (speedway rider) (born 1982), English professional speedway rider
Paul Fenimore Cooper (1899–1970), American traveler and author of children's books and non-fiction
Paul Cooper (composer) (1926–1996), American composer
Paul Shipton (born 1963), children's author who used pseudonym Paul Cooper
Paul Cooper (basketball) (born 1990), American basketball player
Paul Cooper (academic), editor in chief of the Australian Journal of Zoology

See also
Paul Lovatt-Cooper (born 1976), English percussionist and composer